Whatever Happened to... Robot Jones? (simply known as Robot Jones or WHTRJ?) is an American animated television series created by Greg Miller for Cartoon Network. It follows Robot Jones, a teenage robot who attends the fictional suburban Polyneux Middle School in a retrofuturistic 1980s world. Episodes follow Robot Jones researching aspects of human life, including music, facial hair, and gym class. Jones is guided by his three friends, Socks, Mitch, and Cubey. Robot Jones is often smitten with his crush, Shannon Westerburg, a tall, young girl with orthodontic headgear and a prosthesis. In school, Robot Jones interacts with his teachers, Mr. McMcMc, Mr. Workout, and Mrs. Raincoat; the principal, Mr. Madman; and janitor Clancy Q. Sleepyjeans. His arch-rivals, Lenny and Denny Yogman, try to sabotage Jones's research by making school more difficult for him.

Miller's first pilot aired on Cartoon Network on June 16, 2000, as part of "Voice Your Choice Weekend", a contest in which previously unaired pilots were broadcast for viewers to decide which should be given a full series. Even though the Robot Jones pilot ranked second below Grim & Evil in the event, Robot Jones was greenlit for its own series, which premiered on July 19, 2002. The first season voice of Robot Jones was created with a Microsoft Word 97 text-to-speech function. Beginning with the second season, Robot Jones's voice was dubbed over by child actor Bobby Block, and reruns of the first season were re-dubbed with Block's voice overs. The series ended on November 14, 2003, after 13 episodes and a pilot.

Premise

Robot Jones (voiced by a text-to-speech program in the pilot and season 1; Bobby Block in season 2 and season 1 reruns) is a teenage robot living in a fictional early 1980s version of Delaware where robots are commonplace. Robot attempts to learn human nature by attending Polyneux Middle School with his new friends Timothy "Socks" Morton (Kyle Sullivan), a tall boy who loves rock music, Mitch Davis (Gary LeRoi Gray), a headphones-wearing boy whose eyes are hidden by his long hair, and Charles "Cubey" Cubinacle (Myles Jeffrey), a shorter boy who loves video games. He holds a crush on Shannon Westerburg (Grey DeLisle), a girl with a large retainer and prosthetic metal leg.

In each episode, Robot Jones explores a concept faced by average teenagers, such as gym class or competitions. Robot immerses himself in each subject to fully understand it while trying to fit in with his human peers, but this is challenging due to his social ineptitude and others' lack of understanding. As Robot settles in at school, he explores humanoid concepts of his own will. Though the situations he finds himself in are usually at his parents' insistence, others are a result of Robot trying to get closer to Shannon. An example is in "Summer Camp" when Socks convinces Robot to go camping and Robot discovers the ability to feel jealous. Due to his polite nature and short stature, students at his school tend to ignore Robot or are oblivious to his existence. His good grades, poor social skills, and status as a robot are at odds with Principal Madman (Jeff Bennett), a technophobic principal, Mr. McMcMc (Rip Taylor), a jealous and insecure math teacher, and Lenny (Josh Peck) and Denny (Austin Stout) Yogman, two genius twin brothers. At the end of an episode, Robot reads a "data log entry" about what he learned that day and what conclusions he has arrived at on humanity.

The opening sequence, in which Robot Jones is factory-assembled and inserted into a school bus, is an homage to that of 1980s children's show You Can't Do That on Television. When the title of the show is spoken, a group of young children voice the "Whatever Happened to..." part in unison while the "Robot Jones?" part is done by a Macintosh Macintalk voice known as Trinoids. The first season has children speaking out episode titles while season 2 episode titles are spoken by voices of the characters.

Production
Greg Miller's original series pilot aired on Cartoon Network on June 8, 2000, in a contest featuring 11 animated shorts to be chosen for a spot on the network's 2000 schedule. During the weekend of August 25–27, 2000, all 11 pilots aired as part of a 52-hour marathon called "Voice Your Choice Weekend", in which viewers would vote for their favorite pilots. While Grim & Evil won the contest with 57% of the vote, Robot Jones came in second place with 23% and was given its own series run beginning July 19, 2002.

Robot Jones animation style can be seen as a throwback to 1970s and 1980s cartoons such as Schoolhouse Rock!, with an intentionally messy and rough look. The series' animation technique is different from most American cartoons from the early 2000s. It was animated with traditional cel animation, at a time when many American cartoons had switched to digital ink and paint. The show was animated at Rough Draft Studios in Seoul, South Korea.

Greg Miller stated in an interview on Facebook that he used a Microsoft Word 97 text-to-speech software on his old Macintosh computer for Robot's voice during production for season one, but after the first season was completed, the executives of Cartoon Network didn't like how it sounded. Bobby Block was chosen to take the role of Robot in season two. Robot Jones's text-to-speech voice was also recorded for production of the second season, but because the voice change happened during the production of those episodes, this voice was never dubbed into the final prints. In that interview, he also said that he would want to do a revival of Robot Jones, but it would be up to Cartoon Network.

The aforementioned interview also revealed that the show was originally planned to be about Robot Jones growing up in the style of The Wonder Years only to take over the world in the style of The Terminator, and when asked how the show would have ended, Greg Miller explained it would end in the show's version of the 1990s with Robot Jones rallying a robot army to attack the human race.

Episodes

Series overview

Pilot (2000)

Season 1 (2002)

Season 2 (2003)

Broadcast
After production ceased on Robot Jones, it aired in syndication before being removed from Cartoon Network's schedule, but episodes were available online on Cartoon Network Video for a short period.

From 2005 to 2006, Robot Jones reran sporadically on The Cartoon Cartoon Show, along with segments of other Cartoon Cartoons from that time period.

Reruns began airing on Cartoon Network's Latin-American sister network Tooncast in 2015. It has also been added to the local version of HBO Max in 2022.

Robot Jones made a cameo appearance on the OK K.O.! Let's Be Heroes episode "Crossover Nexus" that aired October 8, 2018, along with other Cartoon Network characters from current and ended shows. This marks the first appearance of Robot Jones's character since the show's cancellation and the first time since the first season where the character's voice was provided by the Microsoft Word 97 text-to-speech programmed voice.

See also
 List of fictional robots and androids
 List of science fiction universes

References

External links
  (archive)
 
 
  pilot forum at The Lost Media Wiki

2000s American animated television series
2000s American comic science fiction television series
2002 American television series debuts
2003 American television series endings
American children's animated comic science fiction television series
Animated television series about robots
Cartoon Cartoons
Cartoon Network original programming
Television series by Cartoon Network Studios
English-language television shows
Middle school television series
Teen animated television series
Television series by Rough Draft Studios
Television series set in the 1980s
Television shows set in Delaware